"Candy" is Ken Hirai's thirtieth single, released on September 23, 2009. It is his first single in over a year and five months.

Track list

Charts

Oricon sales chart

Billboard Japan sales chart

Physical sales charts

References

2009 singles
Ken Hirai songs
Songs with lyrics by Shoko Fujibayashi
Songs written by Ken Hirai
Defstar Records singles
2009 songs